The 1994 Mr. Olympia contest was an IFBB professional bodybuilding competition held on September 10, 1994, at the Atlanta Civic Center in Atlanta, Georgia.

Results
The total prize money awarded was $275,000.

Notable events
Dorian Yates won his third consecutive Mr. Olympia title despite sustaining a torn left biceps several weeks before the competition, a deformation on his left biceps was easily visible.
Because of Dorian Yates' injury, controversy arose as many believe Shawn Ray should have been the rightful winner.

References

External links 
 Mr. Olympia
 1994 Mr. Olympia (pictures) 

 1995
1994 in American sports
Mr. Olympia
1994 in bodybuilding